Salvia heterochroa is a perennial plant that is native to Yunnan province in China, found growing on grassy slopes at  elevation.

Inflorescences are 2-6 flowered widely spaced verticillasters in raceme-panicles.

Notes

heterochroa
Flora of China